John Craven McQuiston was an American Brevet Brigadier General who participated in the American Civil War. He participated in the Battle of Ball's Bluff and the Battle of Nashville throughout his career in the war as well as commanding the 123rd Indiana Infantry Regiment.

Biography
McQuiston enlisted on the Union Army on April 23, 1861, as a captain in Company D of the 16th Indiana Infantry Regiment and was stationed at Warrenton Junction. McQuiston first saw active service at the Battle of Ball's Bluff and other battles around the Shenandoah in early 1862.

On May 23, 1862, at Washington, D. C., he was discharged from military service. He then briefly served as a Provost Marshal of the 4th District of Indiana before receiving a commission to become the Colonel of the 123rd Indiana Infantry Regiment on March 7 to 9, 1864. He would go on to serve in battles at the Atlanta campaign as well as the Battle of Nashville. Afterwards, the 123rd Indiana were sent to Washington, D.C. to embark on a steamship to participate in the Campaign of the Carolinas where he engaged in the Battle of Wyse Fork and until the Confederates surrendered.

McQuiston was promoted to Brevet Brigadier General on March 13, 1865. McQuiston and the 123rd Indiana were then mustered out on August 25, 1865, at either Raleigh or Charlotte. He chose to remain in the South after the conclusion of the war, becoming a railroad engineer, conductor and road master before dying on February 22, 1903, at Williford, Arkansas and was buried at Maple Park Cemetery in Springfield, Missouri.

See also
List of American Civil War brevet generals (Union)

References

1823 births
1903 deaths
People from Madison, Indiana
Union Army colonels
Union Army generals
People of Indiana in the American Civil War